Houstonia rubra, the red bluet, is a plant species in the Rubiaceae. It is a small herb with red to reddish-purple flowers, native to the southwestern United States and northern and central Mexico: Coahuila, Nuevo León, Hidalgo, Zacatecas, Guanajuato, Puebla, Sonora, Durango, Chihuahua, Arizona, New Mexico, southeastern Utah and western Texas.

References

rubra
Flora of Arizona
Flora of Chihuahua (state)
Flora of Coahuila
Flora of Durango
Flora of Guanajuato
Flora of Hidalgo (state)
Flora of New Mexico
Flora of Nuevo León
Flora of Puebla
Flora of Texas
Flora of Utah
Flora of Zacatecas
Plants described in 1799
Flora without expected TNC conservation status
Taxa named by Antonio José Cavanilles